Leotropa is a genus of snout moths. It was described by George Hampson in 1918.

Species
Leotropa papuanensis Hampson, 1918
Leotropa phoenicias Hampson, 1918
Leotropa sarcina Hampson, 1918

References

Anerastiini
Pyralidae genera